Włodzimierz Ciołek (born 24 March 1956 in Wałbrzych) is a retired Polish football player.

He played for clubs such as Górnik Wałbrzych and Stal Mielec. In season 1983/84 he was a topscorer of Polish League, playing for Górnik Wałbrzych.

He played for Poland national team, for which he played 29 matches and scored four goals.

Ciołek was a participant at the 1982 FIFA World Cup, where Poland won the third place. He scored a goal against Peru.

Nowadays, Ciołek trains juniors groups in football club PWSZ Górnik Wałbrzych.

References

1956 births
Polish footballers
1982 FIFA World Cup players
Living people
Poland international footballers
Stal Mielec players
Ekstraklasa players
People from Wałbrzych
Sportspeople from Lower Silesian Voivodeship
Association football forwards
Górnik Wałbrzych players
FC Grenchen players